María José Mardomingo Landaburu (born 27 January 1969 in Madrid) is a retired Spanish athlete who specialised in the 100 metres hurdles. She represented her country at the 1996 Summer Olympics, reaching the semifinals, as well as four outdoor and three indoor World Championships.

She has personal bests of 12.89 seconds in the 100 metres hurdles (Atlanta 1996) and 8.08 seconds in the 60 metres hurdles (Madrid 1996).

Competition record

References

1969 births
Living people
Spanish female hurdlers
Athletes (track and field) at the 1992 Summer Olympics
Athletes (track and field) at the 1996 Summer Olympics
Olympic athletes of Spain
Athletes from Madrid
Mediterranean Games bronze medalists for Spain
Mediterranean Games medalists in athletics
Athletes (track and field) at the 1991 Mediterranean Games
Athletes (track and field) at the 1993 Mediterranean Games